Jung Seung-hwan (born August 21, 1996) is a South Korean singer signed under Antenna. He is best known as the runner-up contestant in SBS' K-pop Star Season 4. He is best known for his cover performance of Kim Johan's I Want to Fall in Love (사랑에 빠지고 싶다) on K-pop Star 4 and dominated the Melon Charts for weeks. Before he made his debut, he became popular with his hit OST 'If It Was You (너였다면)'. Throughout his career, he has released several OSTs that have charted. He made his debut in November 2016 with the EP His Voice and later released his full studio album, 'Spring Again', in February 2018. In April 2019, he released his second EP, Dear, My Universe.  In May 2021, he released his third EP, Five Words Left Unsaid.

Discography

Studio albums

Extended plays

Singles

Soundtrack appearances

Other charted songs

Other appearances

Filmography

TV series

Web shows

Radio shows

Awards and nominations

K-Pop Star 4 performances

Notes

References

1996 births
Living people
K-pop singers
South Korean pop singers
South Korean rhythm and blues singers
Musicians from Incheon
K-pop Star participants
Antenna Music artists
21st-century South Korean male singers
South_Korean_male_idols